Verona, Michigan may refer to:

Verona, Calhoun County, Michigan, a former unincorporated community now incorporated in the City of Battle Creek, Michigan
Verona, Huron County, Michigan, a current unincorporated community on the borders of  Verona Township and Sigel Township in Huron County, Michigan